is a national expressway in the Kinki region of Japan. It is owned and operated by West Nippon Expressway Company.

Naming 
Meihan is a kanji acronym of two characters. The first character represents Nagoya (名古屋) and the second character represents Osaka (大阪). Nishi (西) means west; together with the Meihan Expressway and Higashi-Meihan Expressway, it forms a corridor linking the greater Nagoya and Osaka areas.

Passage cities 
Osaka Prefecture
Matsubara - Fujiidera - Habikino - Kashiwara
Nara Prefecture
Kashiba - Kanmaki - Kawai - Ando - Yamatokōriyama - Ando - Yamatokōriyama - Tenri

Interchange list

External links 
 West Nippon Expressway Company

Expressways in Japan
Proposed roads in Japan